Bay of Souls is the seventh published novel by American novelist Robert Stone. It was published in 2003.

Plot summary
Bay of Souls begins in the vein of James Dickey's Deliverance (1970), with the novel's central character Michael Ahearn, and his cronies hunting in the wilds of Minnesota. But Michael's attempts at Hemingwayesque role-playing are limited by his daydreaming, he brings a gun only to justify his presence out in the woods. While Michael waits in a deer stand, a strange hunter despairingly stumbles by, trying to haul a large buck on a pitifully inadequate wheelbarrow. Michael takes pleasure in the other man's humiliation, but the experience proves prophetic of several burdens assumed during the novel and the difficulty characters will have sustaining them. For instance, soon after the hunting incident, Michael's son Paul almost dies from exposure after searching for his dog in the snow. Then Michael's wife, Kristin, breaks her leg trying to carry her son home. After this trauma, Michael finds his relations with his wife deteriorating, and so he turns to the attentions of Lara Purcell, a professor of political science.

A femme fatale with an interest in Caribbean voodoo, Lara leads Michael into high-stakes adultery, which includes erotic play with a gun and cocaine use. She has a murky background involving Soviet espionage and links to South American organized crime. Her devil-may-care attitude toward danger seduces Michael into trying to live out the literary vitalism that he has been studying in his literature class.

Bay of Souls combines elements of these novels when Michael sleeps with Lara without Kristin's knowledge and then welcomes an opportunity to visit Lara's native island, St. Trinity, which is embroiled in its own civil war. When Lara asks, "Are you mine in the ranks of death?" Michael quickly assents. She can supply the kick and the danger missing from his life as a professor and a family man.

Ostensibly, Lara must return to St. Trinity to sell off her stake in the Bay of Saints Hotel but also, given the voodoo religion practiced on the island, she has to preside over the transference of her deceased brother's soul from Guinee, a kind of underwater purgatory, to a place of honor. Additionally, Lara claims she needs to get her soul back because her brother's spirit gave it to a voodoo figure named Marinette, an older female spirit who lives under the sea. This semi-serious religious subtext calls into question all of Lara's motivations. Even though Michael does not fully admit it to himself, he knows that if Lara does not have a soul, then all of her seductive powers come from hidden agents that may have a whole different agenda than the one that Lara professes to have. As he reflects, if she does not have a soul, "then everything between us would be illusion."

While Lara has no problem moving between midwestern academia and Third World intrigue, Michael has difficulty putting his theories into action. Once he arrives in St. Trinity separate from Lara (they have to take different flights), Michael encounters a chaotic world of voodoo drums, warring military camps, CIA intervention, and drug running. Carrying what seems to be drugs and emeralds in three canisters, a small airplane crashes into the ocean, and Lara is partially responsible to the Colombian militia for this loss. She arrives suddenly in Michael's hotel room, has sex with him, and then asks him to undertake a night dive to retrieve the containers. He agrees, thinking, "Without physical courage . . . there is no moral courage." He gets together some scuba diving gear, boats out past a moonlit reef, and then plunges down into one of the deepest parts of the Atlantic Ocean.

Once Michael dives into the water, he finds it almost pleasant to become "a different animal in a different element." He thinks of how he has gotten tired of an academic's constant introspection, certainly a hazard of academic fiction as well. There is color and drama in his attempt to retrieve the packages from a plane overturned deep in the ocean. He has to beware of the plane shifting and locking him inside. He also has to watch his air supply, and the freakish sight of the pilot's bloated body being eaten by all manner of fishes testifies to the "ghastliness inherent in material existence." Here Stone uses horror effects reminiscent of Peter Benchley's Jaws (1974), but he ties it thematically to Lara's attempts to get her brother's soul back from the depths of the ocean. Michael almost suffocates on his ascent from the plane, and he drops one of the more valuable packages, but he makes it back up—just to face a Colombian militia mystified and angered by his involvement.

In a temple nearby, Lara dances in a trance during voodoo rites for her brother. Michael confronts Hilda, the tough-talking militia leader upset over the loss of the drugs, and the novel abruptly shifts into a nighttime drum-filled dreamscape, wherein Michael encounters the voodoo spirit Marinette, who takes on aspects of a succubus embracing him, and a male figure named Baron Samedi who pushes a wheelbarrow loaded down with a goat. Both of the spirits mock Michael's desire to know what is going on. In his delirium, he hears someone whisper, "If I were you . . . I should save my life," and soon he finds himself running from everyone, including Lara, in the darkness, and flies back to Fort Salines and his suspicious wife.

In the end, Bay of Souls is an economical read with a strong conclusion, but it lacks the weight of detail of Stone's other novels, leaving a slimness in characterization in places and a sense of compilation-style recycling of the author's favorite themes and situations. While it lacks the gravitas of Damascus Gate, there is still a surprising and satisfactory sense of judgment at the end that ties together the thematic strands of the rest of the novel.

While St. Trinity ultimately takes on a perverse aura as its rulers look to exploit the island paradise for tourism, Michael finds his hometown lifestyle transformed upon his return. Kristin discovers two boarding passes with Lara and Michael's names on them in his luggage. She divorces Michael and accepts the attentions of Norman, a fellow academic, in his stead. Michael is reduced to living on campus. He feels guilt not only for the deserved loss of his family but also for his abandonment of Lara, who, it turns out, not only survived her trance amid the Colombian militiamen but also became St. Trinity's ambassador to France.

Michael's ultimate crime is that he loses his nerve. He attempts to go to "the ranks of death" with Lara, and he succeeds underwater, but he does not want to confront the voodoo underworld of the island. In a sense, he playacts at facing danger just as he playacted at hunting earlier in the novel. During his dreamlike encounter with Lara in the last scene of the novel, Michael accuses her of sending him to hell, but his problem is much more an internal failing that ends up coloring everything around him. He drops the burden of the possibility of a higher spiritual knowledge, and he is left with nothing as a result. He tries to have it both ways, both risking his soul and saving his life, and the compromise places him in a kind of limbo—"a life suspended on the quivering air."

In the process, Stone hints at a metaphysical understanding that is both darker and deeper than Michael apprehends, but for all Michael's lack of knowledge, judgment is still swift and fierce.

References

External links

Works by Robert Stone (novelist)
2003 American novels
American thriller novels
Novels set in Minnesota
Houghton Mifflin books